{{DISPLAYTITLE:C12H14O4}}
The molecular formula C12H14O4 (molar mass: 222.23 g/mol, exact mass: 222.0892 u) may refer to:

 Apiole
 Blattellaquinone
 Diethyl phthalate
 Dillapiole
 Monobutyl phthalate